GCPC may refer to:

 Government Commercial Purchase Card, a government credit card for small purchases
 Greater Cairo Planning Commission
 Grain Crude Protein Concentration, the percent measure of protein found in grain foodstuffs
 Granule-cell-Purkinje-cell (gcPc)